is a Western-style garden in the Kasumigaokamachi neighborhood of Shinjuku Ward and the Aoyama neighborhood of Minato Ward in Tokyo.

History
It was created by private volunteers to convey the virtues of Emperor Meiji  (3 November 1852 – 30 July 1912), and his wife Empress Shōken.
It was consecrated in 1926 as the outer garden of Meiji Shrine.

Overview
The inner garden is Japanese in style, while the outer garden is Western. Meiji Memorial Picture Gallery and Meiji Jingu Stadium are located in the vast site.

Facilities
 Meiji Memorial Picture Gallery
 Meiji Memorial Hall
 Meiji Jingu Stadium
 Meiji Jingu Gaien Softball Ground
 Meiji Jingu Gaien Nikoniko Park — Children's amusement park
 Meiji Jingu Gaien Ice Skating Rink — Indoor ice skating rink available all year round
 Jingu Gaien Futsal Club — Futsal area
 Meiji Jingu Gaien Tennis Club
 Meiji Jingu Gaien Golf Range
 Meiji Jingu Batting Dome
 Ginkgo trees – A row of ginkgo trees lining Japan National Route 246

Access
 By train: 5 minutes’ walk from Gaiemmae Station on the Tokyo Metro Ginza Line.

Gallery

See also
 Parks and gardens in Tokyo
 National Parks of Japan

References

 Website of Meijijingu Gaien

External links
 Website of Tokyo Convention & Visitors Bureau (in Japanese)

Parks and gardens in Tokyo